"Sola" is a song performed by Italian singer Francesca Michielin. The song was released as a digital download on 31 August 2012 through Sony Music Entertainment Italy as the lead single from her debut studio album Riflessi di me (2012). The song peaked at number 13 on the Italian Singles Chart.

Music video
A music video to accompany the release of "Sola" was first released onto YouTube on 6 September 2012 at a total length of four minutes and nineteen seconds.

Track listing

Chart performance

Weekly charts

Year-end charts

Release history

References

2012 songs
2012 singles
Francesca Michielin songs
Songs written by Roberto Casalino
Songs written by Elisa (Italian singer)